Dato' Billy Ng Seow Meng (Chinese: 黄绍铭, born 1940) is a former Malaysian badminton player.

Career
Ng was the son of Ng Ngoh Tee, who was of Teochew Chinese origin and represented Johor in Badminton championships during the 1920s and 1930s and his wife Mak Cheng Hai, who was a distant relative of another state badminton champion Wong Peng Soon. Billy made his first foray into badminton in August 1959 when he was crowned Malaysian Schoolboy Singles Champion. Then Billy was a student at the renowned Foon Yew High School, Johor Bahru. Later that month, Billy led the Malayan Combined Schools against the Indonesian Youth Team where Billy defeated Lin Dan's current coach Tang Xien Hu in straight sets 15-12 15–12.

Billy represented Malaysia & finished runner-up in the inaugural Asian Badminton Championship (ABC) in 1960. In 1964, Billy became the winner of the 1964 Malaysia Open. He was also a member of the victorious 1967 Thomas Cup team, and of the Malaysian men's team that won the silver in the 1966 Asian Games in Bangkok. Billy also won the Malaysian Open men's singles title in 1965. The Malayan 1967 Thomas Cup team played in an extremely hostile home crowd at the Istora Senayan Stadium, Jakarta.

In 2007, he was inducted into the Olympic Council of Malaysia's Hall of Fame. Three years later in July 2010, Billy Ng was conferred Darjah Indera Mahkota Pahang (DIMP) which carries the title Dato'.

Achievements

Asian Championships 
Men's singles

Southeast Asian Peninsular Games 
Men's singles

References

External links
Johore Bahru District Championships 1959
Photo 1960
Malaysian Open 1964/65
Photo 1965
The Ng badminton family

 Our Forgotten Heroes

1940 births
Living people
People from Johor Bahru
Malaysian sportspeople of Chinese descent
Malaysian people of Teochew descent
Malaysian male badminton players
Asian Games bronze medalists for Malaysia
Asian Games silver medalists for Malaysia
Asian Games medalists in badminton
Badminton players at the 1962 Asian Games
Badminton players at the 1966 Asian Games
Medalists at the 1962 Asian Games
Medalists at the 1966 Asian Games